Pahel may refer to:
 Pol-e Angur
 Pol-e Sharqi